Rosie Jane Day is an English actress, director and writer. She is known for her roles as Mary Hawkins in the Starz series Outlander and Sarah Jessica Parker's daughter in the comedy film All Roads Lead to Rome. She starred as Tina Pemberton in Sky One's Living the Dream and Sierra in the 2018 Summit Entertainment feature Down a Dark Hall.

Day is an ambassador for the teenage mental health charity stem4. Her novel Instructions for a Teenage Armageddon, based on her one-woman play, was published in 2021.

Life and career 
Day has been acting since childhood, both on stage and on screen, following in the footsteps of her older sister. It was at one of her sister's auditions that she was spotted by a casting agent and given her first role, at the age of 4, in BBC's Hope and Glory. In that same year, Day and her sister played two of the Dudakov children in Maxim Gorky's play Summerfolk at the Royal National Theatre in London. She soon became a successful child actor on British television playing roles such as young Tess Elliot in ITV's medical drama Harley Street in 2008, and in theatre including at the Royal Court Theatre and Palace Theatre.

Day never received professional training as an actor, but drew from her experience working with adult co-stars, watching and copying them.

At the age of 16, she played Naomi in the hit stage play Spur of the Moment by award-winning playwright Anya Reiss at the Royal Court Theatre in London's West End.

In 2012 she made her film debut playing Angel, a sex trafficking victim, in Paul Hyett's horror film The Seasoning House. The role brought her positive acclaim and four awards for Best Actress. To prepare for the part, Day conducted intensive "research into the experience of women who [had] been in that situation" and learned sign language to portray the deaf character. The actress later said that she was "young and very naïve" when taking on the role and that the "film certainly had an effect on [her]."

Rosie was chosen as one of Screen International's Stars of Tomorrow in 2013. The special edition magazine highlights up and coming actors and filmmakers in the UK and Ireland.

In 2015 she starred alongside Sarah Jessica Parker, who Day calls "a huge influence", in the romantic comedy All Roads Lead To Rome. From there she returned to the small screen for the recurring role of Mary Hawkins in the second season of Starz's historical drama series Outlander. In 2014, while working with Scottish actor Sam Heughan on Heart of Lightness, a film based upon Henrik Ibsen's play The Lady of the Sea, the Outlander star told her about the character and suggested Day for the part. As part of Outlander's second-season cast, Day received the Satellite award for "Best Cast in a Genre Show" in 2017.

Later that year she starred alongside Uma Thurman in Summit Entertainment's Down a Dark Hall, an American-Spanish horror film, based on the novel by Lois Duncan. Day portrayed troubled teenager Sierra in the female led piece which, as an outspoken feminist, appealed to the actress. Butterfly Kisses, a film in which she was the lead, won the Crystal Bear for best feature at the 67th Berlinale festival in 2017.

Day starred as Tina Pemberton in the Sky One family comedy-drama Living the Dream from 2017 to 2019. In 2019 she played Jane Asher in Sky Arts 'Urban Myth: Scrambled Eggs'.

In 2021 she starred alongside Russell Tovey and Sian Clifford in the comedy Real Love, and voiced the character Meteion in Final Fantasy XIV: Endwalker.

Filmography

Filmmaking credits

Film

Television

Theatre

Other

References

External links
 
 Troika Talent profile
 Shooting begins on The Seasoning House
 shocktillyoudrop.com/news Exclusive: First Photos, Set Report from The Seasoning House

Living people
21st-century English actresses
Actresses from Cambridgeshire
English child actresses
English film actresses
English stage actresses
English television actresses
English voice actresses
People from Cambridge
Year of birth missing (living people)